Sinogastromyzon tonkinensis is a species of ray-finned fish in the genus Sinogastromyzon. It is endemic to the Red River drainage in northern Vietnam and Yunnan, southern China. It grows to  SL. Very little is known about ecology of this species that is used in some subsistence fisheries.

References

Sinogastromyzon
Freshwater fish of China
Fish of Vietnam
Hong River
Fish described in 1935